Caleb Ellis (April 16, 1767 – May 6, 1816) was an American politician and lawyer who served as a member of the United States Representative, representing the states's at-large congressional district.

Early life and education
Ellis was born in Walpole in the Province of Massachusetts Bay. After graduating from Harvard University in 1793, he worked as a school teacher in Dedham, Massachusetts. He later studied law and was admitted to the Massachusetts Bar Association. He then moved to Newport, New Hampshire and eventually to Claremont, New Hampshire.

Career
Ellis was a member of the New Hampshire House of Representatives in 1803.

Elected as a Federalist to the Ninth Congress, Ellis was United States Representative for the state of New Hampshire from March 4, 1805 to March 3, 1807. After service in Congress, he was member of the New Hampshire Governor’s council in 1809 and 1810. In addition, he served in the New Hampshire Senate in 1811. He was a presidential elector on the Clinton and Ingersoll ticket in 1812.

Appointed Justice of the Superior Court of New Hampshire in 1813, Ellis held the office until his death.

Ellis was elected a member of the American Antiquarian Society in 1815.

Death
Ellis died in Claremont, New Hampshire on May 6, 1816 at the age of 49. He is interred at the Broad Street Cemetery in Claremont, New Hampshire.

References

External links

1767 births
1816 deaths
Harvard University alumni
American Congregationalists
People from Walpole, Massachusetts
Federalist Party members of the United States House of Representatives from New Hampshire
People from Claremont, New Hampshire
Burials in New Hampshire
Members of the American Antiquarian Society
Educators from Dedham, Massachusetts